Esther Roibete Apuahe is a surgeon from Papua New Guinea, and the first woman surgeon in the country. In 2014, she won the Steamships Public Sector Award at the Westpac Outstanding Woman of the Year Awards.

Education
Apuahe attended the University of Papua New Guinea and graduated in 2002 with a MBBS. She began her surgical training in 2008 at Port Moresby General Hospital, and was the only woman in the class. She earned a Master of Surgery in 2011, becoming the first woman in Papua New Guinea to qualify as a surgeon.

Career
Prior to her surgical career, Apuahe worked in an emergency department in Rabaul. She also worked one year in pediatrics. As of May 2019, Apuahe was completing a one-year neurosurgery placement at Townsville Hospital.

References

Living people
Papua New Guinean surgeons
Year of birth missing (living people)
University of Papua New Guinea alumni
Women surgeons